Meredith Dawn Salenger is an American actress. Her credits include the 1985 film The Journey of Natty Gann, as the title character, and the 1989 teen comedy Dream a Little Dream.

Early life and education
Salenger was born and raised in Malibu, California, the daughter of Dorothy, an interior designer, and Gary Salenger, a dentist. She is Jewish; her family was originally from Austria and Russia.

Salenger attended Santa Monica High School and enrolled at Harvard University from 1988 to 1992, and lived in Mower Hall during her freshman year, where Tanya Selvaratnam was one of her roommates. Salenger graduated cum laude with a degree in psychology. She received certificates in "Court-Based Mediation of Family Law Matters" and "Mediating the Litigated Case" from the Straus Institute for Dispute Resolution at Pepperdine University School of Law in 2009 and 2011, respectively. She works as a mediator for the Agency for Dispute Resolution in Beverly Hills, California, when she is not filming.

Career
As a child, Salenger enjoyed performing in front of her family and friends. Her mother took her to her first acting class when she was eight years old. Her first role was a small part as a 'singing and dancing orphan' in the feature film Annie, directed by John Huston. Salenger also did a number of television advertisements. 

Salenger's first starring role was in the Disney film The Journey of Natty Gann. After starring in four more films by her eighteenth birthday, including A Night in the Life of Jimmy Reardon, The Kiss (1988) and Dream a Little Dream (1989), she left Hollywood for Harvard to further her education. 

Salenger resumed her acting career upon her return to Hollywood with credits including Lake Placid and The Third Wheel. Salenger has also appeared in independent films, including Quality Time and Sparkle & Charm.

Salenger appeared in a 1998 episode of Buffy the Vampire Slayer. She also recorded a song titled "Flow Through Me" with Koishii and Hush; and she appeared as a background member of the Counting Crows video for "Hanging Around".

Salenger appeared in two episodes of Dawson's Creek in 2002 as film critic Amy Lloyd, and guest-starred on Cold Case playing victim Sloane Easton on the episode "Ravaged". Salenger had a cameo in the Disney film Race to Witch Mountain in 2009, where she played a television reporter named Natalie Gann.

Salenger has done the voices of several characters in Cartoon Network's Star Wars: The Clone Wars, including Jedi Padawan Barriss Offee and Ione Marcy during the second season, Che Amanwe Papanoida during the third season, and Pluma Sodi during the fourth season. She also appeared as Lisa Sanders in the one-hour Nick at Nite drama series Hollywood Heights which lasted 80 episodes, as well as several characters in Mad and Robot Chicken television series. In addition, Salenger voiced a Nightsister ghost in a season three episode of Star Wars Rebels. She can be seen opposite Elias Koteas in Jake Squared along with Virginia Madsen and Jennifer Jason Leigh.

Personal life
Salenger and comedian Patton Oswalt were engaged in July 2017. They married on November 4, 2017.

Filmography

Film

Television

Awards and nominations

References

External links
 

American child actresses
American film actresses
American television actresses
Living people
People from Malibu, California
Harvard University alumni
Pepperdine University School of Law alumni
Actresses from Los Angeles County, California
20th-century American actresses
21st-century American actresses
American people of Russian-Jewish descent
American people of Austrian-Jewish descent
Year of birth missing (living people)